The Japanese catshark (Apristurus japonicus) is a catshark of the family Scyliorhinidae, found in the northwest Pacific off Chiba Prefecture, Honshū, Japan, between 36 and 34°N. 
This shark has a relatively slender body, with the trunk tapering towards the head. Its snout is moderately long, bell-shaped, and broad; the preoral snout is about 7 to 8% of total its length. It has large gill slits, rather small eyes in adults, nostrils fairly broad, and a long broad, arched mouth. It is commonly taken by trawl off the type locality, and possibly used for oil, human consumption, and fishmeal or fish cakes locally.

References

 

Japanese catshark
Fish of Japan
Taxa named by Kazuhiro Nakaya
Japanese catshark